Almstedt is a village and a former municipality in the district of Hildesheim in Lower Saxony, Germany. Since 1 November 2016, it is part of the municipality Sibbesse. Almstedt consists of the village of Almstedt and the smaller village of Segeste. Each of the villages has a sightworthy old church and well-preserved half-timbered houses. The church in Segeste was built in 1770.

References

Hildesheim (district)
Former municipalities in Lower Saxony